ITS Dental College is a private, self-financing, co-educational institute, hospital and research centre located in Greater Noida, Uttar Pradesh, India. It is affiliated with Chaudhary Charan Singh University, Meerut. It was founded in 2006 by Durga Charitable Trust.

History
ITS Dental College Greater Noida was established in 2006 by Durga Charitable Trust. It is part of the ITS Education group was founded in 1996 by Dr. R.P. Chadha. The group provides teaching and learning practices in the areas of Dental, Engineering, Management and Pharmacy Education. The institute is accredited with NABH and NAAC.

Academics
The college provides the following courses:
 Bachelor of Dental Surgery (BDS): It is a five-years full time degree program that leads to a Bachelor Of Dental Surgery.
 Master of Dental Surgery (MDS): It is a three years full time Post-graduate degree program available with the streams like Oral Surgery, Public Health Dentistry, Oral Medicine, Orthodontics, Periodontics, Conservative Dentistry, Prosthodontics and Pedodontics.
It also provides certificate courses in Implantology.

Campus

ITS Dental College is a four storied building with attached Dental Hospital. College has four audio-visually equipped Lecture halls with 100 students capacity. An aesthetically designed Auditorium is built within the College building which provides space to organize various cultural events. College also had an attached 100 bed general hospital "ITS Surya Hospital". All departments have separate clinical section for both UG and PG. College has two spacious & hi-tech Pre-Clinical labs each for Prosthodontics and Conservative Dentistry. An air-conditioned library is available for students.

The college campus has facilities for all types of Indoor and Outdoor sports. It has a Cricket ground, Basketball court, Open court for Throwball ; Volleyball; and Badminton. Campus has a common room for Indoor Games such as Table Tennis, Foosball, Pool, Carom and Chess. College has a modern gym with a physical instructor. An aesthetic Infinity Café is located within the campus.

Hospital
ITS Dental College has a dedicated teaching hospital – ITS Dental Hospital, attached to its main building. Being only dental hospital to serve Gautam Buddha Nagar & numerous villages splattered around this area.

The college is also attached to the 100+ bedded General Hospital, for additional clinical training of the students on OT facilities for the oral & maxillofacial surgeries and General Medicine and General Surgery Hospital training for Under Graduates.

Accommodation
College has separate hostel facilities for UG & PGs. It also has quarters for college staff, a bungalow for Principal and a Guest House within the campus.

Rankings 

In 2019 the college ranked 30 in Outlook Indias "Top 40 Dental Colleges In 2019", 25 in India Todays "Best Dental Colleges 2019" and 18 out of 22 dental colleges by The Week.

Social Initiatives
ITS Dental College has undertaken a “Go Green” initiative. Its main focus is on reduction of carbon footprints, solid waste management, alternative energy resources, etc. Dr. R P Chadha, Chairman of ITS Education group contributed for "PM Cares Fund" and  “CM Covid Funds” and cheque has been handed over to Hon'ble General V. K. Singh, Minister of State for Road Transport and Highways, Government of India. since 1995, ITS - The Education Group has been contributing to the help in natural disasters such as 2001 Gujarat earthquake, Tragedy of Kedarnath, Kargil War and others.

MoU
The institute signed a MoU with Universidad Católica San Antonio de Murcia Spain.

Awards
"Rashtriya Shiksha Shiromani Award" For Contribution In The Field Of Education At All India Achiever Conference International Conclave.
Better India Education Award 2019 for best dental college of the year
Most preferred UG/PG institute of the year 2019. Award was conferred by 13th president of India Shri Pranab Mukherjee
ED-TECH Higher Education Award

Events

Annual Cultural Fest – Occlusion: Bollywood Celebrities such as Randeep Hudda, Kanika Kapoor, Badshaah and many more visited the college for their movie promotion.
Nukkad naatak was being held at the campus with a message onNo Tobacco Day
Mata Ki Chowki event organizes every Year at the college campus

References

Educational institutions established in 2006
2006 establishments in Uttar Pradesh